The OPAP Basket League  is currently the top-tier level men's professional basketball competition of the Cypriot basketball league system. It is run and governed by the Cyprus Basketball Federation.

Format
All teams are playing against each other for the first part of the league, with the top 4 teams reaching the play-off semi-finals stage. One team (the last one) at the end of the season is relegated to the second division, whilst one team from the second division is promoted.

The play-off semi-finals and the championship winner will be decided after three wins. The championship winner, along with the winners of the Cypriot Cup, will qualify to compete in the next season's FIBA's European-wide continental competitions.

Teams and locations
The following eight teams (in alphabetical order) are competing in OPAP Basket League:

Champions

Performance by club

See also
 Cypriot Basketball Cup
 Cypriot Basketball Super Cup

External links
Cyprus Basketball Federation Official Site 
Eurobasket.com League Page
Rebound.com.cy - Basketball News Website

 
Basketball leagues in Cyprus
Professional sports leagues in Cyprus